This is a list of presidents of Romania by time in office. This is based on the difference between dates; if counted by number of calendar days all the time periods would be one day greater.

The political party column in the table below denotes the political party or political alliance that sustained/supported their candidacy, as the president is legally forbidden by the Romanian constitution to be a member of any party while still in office. The only exception was Nicolae Ceaușescu, who was president under a different constitution, and who consequently was both a member of the PCR and president of Romania at the same time. Also, Traian Băsescu was the only president suspended/impeached twice to date (once in each of his two mandates, more specifically in 2007 and 2012).

Notes:

1 

Presidents
List
Romania, Presidents
Presidents of Romania by time in office